Severin Cornet ( – March 1582) was a Franco-Flemish singer, conductor and composer. He was born about 1530 in Valenciennes and studied music in Naples. After completing his education, he served for a while at Mechlin, took a position as singer in Antwerp, and later a position as music director for the Archduke in Innsbruck where he worked from 1572 until 1581. He composed a number of vocal works, including polyphonic madrigals and French chansons in the Italian style, and published a book of villaneche in Antwerp in 1563 with Genoese sponsorship. Cornet died in Antwerp.

References

External links

Parmi di star by Severin Cornet, The King's Singers, from YouTube

1530s births
1582 deaths

Dutch male classical composers
Dutch classical composers
Renaissance composers
Year of birth uncertain
People from Valenciennes